Expo 2019 was an international horticultural exposition presented by the Bureau International des Expositions and was held in Yanqing District, Beijing, People's Republic of China. Expo 2016 in Antalya, Turkey was the previous one. The exposition began on 29 April 2019 and closed on 7 October 2019. The site was 503 hectares, and 16 million visitors were expected.

It was the largest ever gardening show. Two villages were relocated for the expo.

References

External links 
 

2019 festivals
2010s in Beijing
April 2019 events in China
Events in Beijing
World's fairs in China
Yanqing District